Senate elections were held in Kenya on 4 March 2013 as part of the general elections. Under the new constitution, which was passed in a 2010 referendum, the 2013 elections were the first run by the Independent Electoral and Boundaries Commission (IEBC). The constitution re-established the Senate, previously disbanded in 1966. The new body was to have 47 elected members (one for each county) and 20 nominated members (16 women appointed on the basis of elected seat distribution, two representing youth and two representing people with disabilities). The Speaker of the Senate, who is an ex-officio member, was elected by the Senators during the first sitting of the Senate.

Results summary

Members

Elected

Nominated

Women

Youth

Persons with disabilities

Changes during term

Nominated members

By-elections

References 

Lists of members of the Senate of Kenya by term